The 2013–14 season will be Budapest Honvéd FC's 103rd competitive season, 9th consecutive season in the OTP Bank Liga and 104th year in existence as a football club.

First team squad

Transfers

Summer

In:

Out:

Winter

In:

Out:

List of Hungarian football transfers summer 2013
List of Hungarian football transfers winter 2013–14

Statistics

Appearances and goals
Last updated on 1 June 2014.

|-
|colspan="14"|Youth players:

|-
|colspan="14"|Out to Loan:

|-
|colspan="14"|Players no longer at the club:

|}

Top scorers
Includes all competitive matches. The list is sorted by shirt number when total goals are equal.

Last updated on 1 June 2014

Disciplinary record
Includes all competitive matches. Players with 1 card or more included only.

Last updated on 1 June 2014

Overall
{|class="wikitable"
|-
|Games played || 43 (30 OTP Bank Liga, 4 Europa League, 3 Hungarian Cup and 6 Hungarian League Cup)
|-
|Games won || 14 (10 OTP Bank Liga, 2 Europa League, 1 Hungarian Cup and 1 Hungarian League Cup)
|-
|Games drawn || 8 (6 OTP Bank Liga, 0 Europa League, 1 Hungarian Cup and 1 Hungarian League Cup)
|-
|Games lost || 21 (14 OTP Bank Liga, 2 Europa League, 1 Hungarian Cup and 4 Hungarian League Cup)
|-
|Goals scored || 60
|-
|Goals conceded || 58
|-
|Goal difference || +2
|-
|Yellow cards || 104
|-
|Red cards || 5
|-
||Worst discipline ||  Raffaele Alcibiade (11 , 1 )
|-
||Best result || 9–0 (H) v Čelik Nikšić – UEFA Europa League – 11 July 2013
|-
||Worst result || 0–3 (H) v Szigetszentmiklós – Hungarian League Cup – 20 November 2013
|-
||Most appearances ||  Patrik Hidi (36 appearances)
|-
||Top scorer ||  Ayub Daud (8 goals)
|-
|Points || 50/129 (38.76%)
|-

Nemzeti Bajnokság I

Matches

Classification

Results summary

Results by round

Hungarian Cup

League Cup

Group stage

Classification

Champions League

The First and Second Qualifying Round draws took place at UEFA headquarters in Nyon, Switzerland on 24 June 2013.

Pre-season

References

External links
 Eufo
 Official Website
 UEFA
 fixtures and results

Budapest Honvéd FC seasons
Budapest Honved